A Glengarry is a boat-shaped cap without a peak made of thick-milled woollen material.

Glengarry may also refer to any of the following:

Places

In Australia
 Glengarry, New South Wales, an opal mining field.
 Glengarry, Tasmania
 Glengarry, Victoria, a town in Australia
 Glengarry (Campus of The Scots College), Sydney, Australia
 Glengarry, Western Australia, A suburb of Perth

In Canada
Alberta
 Glengarry (Edmonton), a residential neighbourhood in Edmonton, Canada
Nova Scotia
 Glengarry, Inverness County
 Glengarry, Lunenburg, Nova Scotia
 Glengarry, Pictou, Nova Scotia

Ontario
 Glengarry (electoral district), a former federal electoral district represented in the Canadian House of Commons
 Glengarry County, Ontario, a historic county in the Canadian province of Ontario
 Glengarry—Prescott—Russell, a federal and provincial electoral district in Ontario, Canada
 Glengarry and Stormont, a former federal electoral district represented in the Canadian House of Commons
 North Glengarry, Ontario, a township in eastern Ontario, Canada
 South Glengarry, Ontario, a township in eastern Ontario, Canada
 Stormont, Dundas and Glengarry United Counties, Ontario, a census division of the Canadian province of Ontario
 Stormont—Dundas—South Glengarry, a federal and provincial electoral district in Ontario, Canada

In New Zealand
 Glengarry, New Zealand, a suburb of Invercargill

In the United Kingdom
 A valley in the Scottish Highlands: see Invergarry

Organisations
 Glengarry Shinty Club, a shinty team from Glengarry, Inverness-shire, Scotland
 The Stormont, Dundas and Glengarry Highlanders, a reserve infantry regiment of the Canadian Forces
 Glengarry Bhoys, a Celtic fusion band from Canada
 Glengarry Light Infantry, properly the Glengarry Light Infantry Fencibles, a light infantry unit raised in Glengarry District of Upper Canada to fight in the War of 1812.

People
 Clan MacDonnell of Glengarry, a Scottish clan
 Alexander Ranaldson MacDonell of Glengarry (1771–1828), 15th chief of Clan MacDonell of Glengarry